Stephan Joho (born 4 September 1963) is a Swiss former professional cyclist. He is most known for winning two stages in the Giro d'Italia. He also competed in the individual pursuit and points race events at the 1984 Summer Olympics.

References

1963 births
Living people
Swiss male cyclists
People from Bremgarten, Aargau
Tour de Suisse stage winners
Olympic cyclists of Switzerland
Cyclists at the 1984 Summer Olympics
Swiss Giro d'Italia stage winners
Sportspeople from Aargau